Bataan's 2nd congressional district is one of the three congressional districts of the Philippines in the province of Bataan. It has been represented in the House of Representatives since 1987. The district consists of the provincial capital Balanga and adjacent southern Bataan municipalities of Limay, Orion and Pilar. It is currently represented in the 19th Congress by Albert Garcia of the National Unity Party (NUP).

Representation history

Election results

2022

2019

2016

2013

2010

See also
Legislative districts of Bataan

References

Congressional districts of the Philippines
Politics of Bataan
1987 establishments in the Philippines
Congressional districts of Central Luzon
Constituencies established in 1987